The Congress Dances is a 1955 Austrian historical musical film directed by Franz Antel and starring Johanna Matz, Rudolf Prack and Hannelore Bollmann. It is a remake of the 1930 film The Congress Dances, about a romance that takes place during the Congress of Vienna in 1814.

It was made with the backing of Gloria Film, a leading West German distributor. The film was shot in Eastmancolor, with sets designed by art directors Isabella and Werner Schlichting. It was shot at three studios in Vienna, the Rosenhugel, Sievering and Schönbrunn Studios. Location shooting took place around the city, and in the Wachau. It was the first Austrian film to be made in Cinemascope.

Cast

References

Bibliography

External links 
 

1955 films
1955 musical comedy films
1955 romantic comedy films
1950s historical comedy films
Austrian romantic comedy films
Austrian musical comedy films
Austrian historical musical films
1950s German-language films
Films directed by Franz Antel
Films set in Vienna
Films set in the 1810s
Remakes of German films
Balls (dance party) in films
Cultural depictions of Klemens von Metternich
1950s historical romance films
Gloria Film films
1950s historical musical films
Films set in the Austrian Empire
Films shot at Sievering Studios
Films shot at Schönbrunn Studios
Films shot at Rosenhügel Studios
Congress of Vienna